Carolyn Wilson (born 11 March 1959) is a British former synchronized swimmer. She was the European solo champion in 1981, 1983 and 1985. She won 7 European Gold medals, and competed in the women's duet competition at the  gaining a 4th place.

Wilson choreographed the synchronized swimming scenes in the Kenneth Branagh film Love's Labour's Lost (2000 film) and has appeared on a number of television programmes such as Jim'll Fix It, The Generation Game and How Do They Do That?. She was also one of the swimmers in the Carling Black Label UK TV advert "Lady of the Lake"

She retired from competitive synchronized swimming in August 1985. She is a life member of Rushmoor Synchronized Swimming Club.

Wilson holds a BSc Hons degree in Botany & Zoology from Bristol University (1981), a Postgraduate Certificate in Education from Reading University and a First Class Master's degree with Distinction in Institutional Management & Leadership for Professional Development from Southampton University (2007). She is currently Assistant Deputy Head & Head of Science at a school in Guildford, England.

References

External links 
 British Olympic Association
 FINA
 Rushmoor Synchronised Swimming Club

1959 births
Living people
British synchronised swimmers
Olympic synchronised swimmers of Great Britain
Synchronized swimmers at the 1984 Summer Olympics